The Plaza Super Cinema and Variety Theatre cinema in Stockport, England opened in 1932 and is now a Grade II* listed building. After being a bingo hall for many years, it has now been restored as a cinema and theatre, showing classic films and staging live shows.

Building
The building is in the Art Deco style, it was constructed in 1932 to a design by William Thornley. It opened as a cine-variety venue. It had an original seating capacity of 1878 (other sources say 1848)- and in its restored state has 614 seats in the stalls, 318 in the front circle and 254 in the rear circle (the balcony). The site involved cutting into the rock.

Compton Theatre Organ
To possess an original Compton Organ is rare, but the Plaza organ is notable in its own right. It was the first Compton Theatre Organ to be built with sunburst decorative glass panels. These can be illuminated in a range of colours.

The Compton organ is a three manual instrument with a unique 150 stop tab layout which was designed for the Plaza and her sister cinema by Norman Cocker the resident organist from Manchester Cathedral and Arthur Ward one of the original Directors of the Stockport Plaza. It has in addition 42 toe and thumb pistons. There are 11 ranks of pipes situated in 2 chambers, one over the other to the right of the stage. These are concealed behind the decorative grill in the wall. There is no electric amplification, as the sound is produced acoustically straight from the organ pipes. The console is on a lift so that it can rise out of the floor, adding to the theatrical effect. As there is no amplification the organist controls the volume using swell pedals that operate shutters in the grill. It was played before shows, and during silent movies, variety acts and musical interludes between films. The organ can supply a large  range of effects from sleigh bells to aircraft and sea sounds.

History

Early history
The first plans for a cinema on this site was made by William Thornley in 1929. It was a conservative scheme that incorporated a motor garage, a billiard hall, a restaurant with a 1600-seat cinema. Thornley, who had trained with Bradshaw Gass & Hope was experienced in designing silent movie cinemas. The owners of the site rejected the scheme. They had just opened the 1850 seat Regal Cinema, Altrincham which was designed by Drury and Gomersall and described as the ‘Cathedral of the Movies’. Thornley was commissioned to modify the Altrincham plans to fit on the more restricted Stockport site. 

10,000 tonnes of sandstone was excavated to create The Plaza and the adjoining Plaza steps by outside labourers. The building was partially underground. The cinema was an Art Deco gem which was welcomed by the local cinema goers but opposed by the local business community, smarting from the use of outsiders when the town was still suffering from the Great Depression. Technically the cinema had all the latest equipment the projectors that could project silent and sound stock, and a Compton organ to be played during the silent news reels. It  was a cine-variety venue.

The Plaza attracted competition and by 1939 there were two further super cinemas in the town centre- and two in the suburbs. After the war, in the 1950s The Plaza was refurbished and diversified into CinemaScope and 3-D screenings. The conversion to a Bingo Hall was refused by Stockport Borough Council planning committee- this ruling was overturned by National government and Rank Leisure proceeded with their plan.

The Bingo Years
Bought in 1967, the Plaza operated as a Mecca Bingo Hall until 1999.

Restoration
The Plaza was sold to the Stockport Plaza Trust, first restorations started, and it re-opened for live shows and vintage film presentations. The first cinema show in December 2000 featured a performance of 42nd St which had been the first film shown at the Plaza in 1932. The Compton organ was found to be in working order, it was powered up and a performance of 1930s singalong music was given by Nigel Ogden. The Plaza was closed during 2009, and £1.9m restoration, funded by a National Lottery grant took place.
Volunteers embarked on THE restoration of The Plaza to its original 1932 configuration. Most of the façade has now been unveiled and sports new name sign as well as red and green side panels, all constructed with neon lighting. The entire face has also been completely restored to its original cream ensemble.

Timeline
Cinema
1929 (April): First Planning application made to Stockport Borough Council for the construction of Cinema, Mersey Square, Stockport.

1931: Construction of the Regal Cinema, Altrincham, designed by Drury and Gomersall for the Snape Cinema Circuit.

1932 (Oct): Cinema opens in Stockport

1937: Front Circle rake altered, balcony front raised, stage level raised

1949: Seven day programme introduced (same film for 7 days)

1953 (Aug): Large 48 ft.x 18 ft. projection screen installed

1953: Stockport's first 3D film presentation at - “Sangaree”

1954: first ‘CinemaScope’ presentation

1960: first Pantomime 'Babes in the Wood' featuring The Dallas Boys

1965 (July): purchased by the Mecca Group

1966 (Dec): closes as a cinema
Bingo Hall
1967: Modifications to the auditorium to accommodate bingo; removal of roof tiling, loss of external verandah, neon lighting & signage. Flat floor insertion at rear of stalls, and alterations to foyer. Alterations to café area.

1967 (Feb): reopens as a Bingo Hall

1997 (Mar): Cinema listed grade II by English Heritage

1999: Cinema closes as a Bingo Hall

Restored cinema
2000 (Aug): listing upgraded to II* by English Heritage

2000: Purchased by the Stockport Plaza Trust, first restorations started, and re opened for live shows and vintage film presentations. First cinema  show in December 2000 featured a performance of 42nd St which had been the first film shown at the Plaza in 1932. There was also a variety performance, and Nigel Ogden of Radio 2's The Organist Entertains played the Compton Organ for a 1930s style singalong before the screening.( The organ had been found to be in full working order, only needing the power switched on to be used.)
 
2005: Further restoration plans begin

2007: The Heritage Lottery Fund approves an application for funding of £1.9m towards further restoration of the Plaza

2009 (Feb): Jimmy Carr officially closes the Plaza with two sell out shows and work begins on Restoration and Refurbishment of the Stockport Plaza

2009 (May): 'Plaza on Tour' commences - a host of events in alternative venues throughout the region during the Plaza's closure

2009 (Dec): The Plaza reopens following a £3.2 million restoration

2010 (Jan): 10 Years On Show featuring Plaza Volunteers and Youth, Joe Loss Orchestra and local talent staged to celebrate 10 Years on the saving of the Plaza.

2012 (Apr): Plaza obtains a venue licence enabling it to host wedding ceremonies, Louise Burchell & Ben Wainwright become the first to be wed at the Plaza Cinema, Stockport.

2013: Front Circle rake restored and balcony front lowered to original design, stage surface renewed

2014 (Jul/Aug): Brand new art deco seating cast from the original designs for the entire auditorium, removing the mixed origin seating.

2015 (May): Murals re-instated in Balcony of Wetherlam and Little Langdale Tarn in the Lake District.

2015 (Aug): Compton Organ restoration including the glass panel sides, pipes & bellows.

2016 (July): Murals re-instated in Stalls of musical instruments which include cymbals, tambourines, wind and various string instruments.

Filming location for
Used as filming location including:-
 Life on Mars (UK TV series) (Season 2, Episode 6 - 2007)
 The Maple State, Temperate Lives (2009) 
 Just Henry (2011)
 Eric and Ernie (2011)
 Who Do You Think You Are? (UK TV series) (Series 10, Episode 3; Minnie Driver - 2013)
 Messages Home: Lost films of the British Army (2016)
 Road To Wembley (2016)
 Tina and Bobby (2017)
 Time for Tea [Short Film] (2017)
 Peaky Blinders (Series 5, episode 6 - 2019) as the Bingley Hall in Birmingham
 Federal Charm, Can't Rule Me (2019) 
 Bargain Hunt (Series 54 Episode 22 - 2019) 
 The Stranger (2020) Netflix 
 Larkins, Are we having any fun yet (2020) 
 Jason Manford, Muddle Class (2020) 
 Blossoms live at the Plaza Stockport (2020) 
 A Certain Ratio "Keep It Together" music video (2021) 
 Blossoms "Care For" music video (2021) 
 Blossoms "Ribbon Around the Bomb" Album Short Film (2022)

See also

Grade II* listed buildings in Greater Manchester
Listed buildings in Stockport

Notes and references
Notes

Footnotes

External links

The Stockport Plaza official website
The Stockport Plaza official Facebook page

Buildings and structures completed in 1933
Cinemas in Greater Manchester
Grade II* listed buildings in Greater Manchester
Buildings and structures in Stockport
Grade II* listed theatres
Public venues with a theatre organ